Temistocle is an Italian male given name, which is derived from Themistocles. The name may refer to:

Temistocle Calzecchi-Onesti (1853–1922), Italian physicist
Temistocle Popa (1921–2013), Romanian composer
Temistocle Solera (1815–1878), Italian opera composer and librettist 
Temistocle Testa (1897–1949), Italian politician
Temistocle Zammit (1864–1935), Maltese archaeologist 
Temistocle Zona (1848–1910), Italian astronomer

Italian masculine given names
Given names of Greek language origin